Marcus G. Curry (born June 1, 1961), known professionally as Mark Curry, is an American actor, comedian, and host. Curry is best known for his role as Mark Cooper, ex–basketball player turned teacher on the ABC sitcom Hangin' with Mr. Cooper which originally aired from 1992 to 1997. Curry also served as one of the various hosts of the syndicated series It's Showtime at the Apollo during the early 1990s. Curry co-starred in all three seasons of See Dad Run, Nick At Nite's first original live-action family comedy series, from 2012 to 2015.

Early life and education
Born in Oakland, California Curry is the youngest of nine. Curry attended St. Joseph Notre Dame High School in Alameda, California, and California State University, East Bay in Hayward, California. As a child, Curry was a participant at the East Oakland Youth Development Center (EOYDC), a local youth organization.

Career
Curry's first role was in the 1991 feature film Talkin' Dirty After Dark where he appeared alongside Martin Lawrence.

Curry's first major role was on the ABC sitcom Hangin' with Mr. Cooper which  made its debut in September 1992. On the show he played the lead role of Mark Cooper, an NBA player-turned-substitute teacher/gym coach. Hangin' with Mr. Cooper was eventually on air for five seasons with over a hundred episodes.

In 1994 Curry guest starred on the sitcom Living Single. In 1997, he made another guest appearance on the sitcom Martin.
Curry was later featured on two episodes of The Jamie Foxx Show as eccentric driving instructor Sergeant Easy.

Curry also made cameos in the 1997 feature film Switchback and 1998 feature film Armageddon.

In 2000, Curry had a recurring role on The Drew Carey Show as  Robert Soulard, Drew Carey's boss. 
That year he also hosted the Comedy Central game show Don't Forget Your Toothbrush and made a guest appearance on the sitcom For Your Love with his Hangin' with Mr. Cooper co-star, Holly Robinson Peete.

Curry went on to play the lead role of scientist Norton Ballard in the Disney Channel Original Movie The Poof Point. The movie reunited Curry with Hangin' with Mr. Cooper co-star Dawnn Lewis, who played the his onscreen wife Marigold.

Curry was the host of the PAX-TV show Animal Tails and BET's Coming to the Stage in 2003. In 2004, he appeared on Celebrity Mole Yucatan. He came in second place to Dennis Rodman.

In 2005, Curry was featured on an episode of Less Than Perfect and guest starred as Max Cooper on two episodes of Fat Actress. Curry made another guest appearance on a 2008 episode of the sitcom House of Payne.
On November 30, 2008, Curry performed a stand-up comedy routine on The Comedy Festival Laffapalooza Special which was hosted by Tracy Morgan.

From 2009 to 2011, Curry hosted Jamie Foxx's FoxxHole Live every Monday in the Conga Room in Los Angeles, which was heard on satellite radio stations Sirius 106/XM 149. In 2012, Curry joined Sommore, Earthquake, Bruce Bruce, and Tony Rock on the Royal Comedy Tour.

He later appeared on two episodes of The Secret Life of the American Teenager.
Curry also starred in Nick At Nite's first-ever original live-action family sitcom, See Dad Run, which debuted in 2012, as Marcus, who's a friend of Scott Baio's character. See Dad Run eventually ran for three seasons on the network.

In 2014, Curry joined Sommore's Standing Ovation Comedy Tour along with Bill Bellamy, Tommy Davidson, and others. That same year, Bounce TV launched the sitcom One Love, starring Curry and Sheryl Lee Ralph. In 2018, Curry was a special guest on the Katt Williams 11:11 Tour. Since 2018, Curry has also regularly performed stand-up comedy at the Hollywood Improv.

Music
Curry was featured in the music video for Too Short's "I Ain't Trippin'". He also appeared in the music video of Bow Wow's "Take Ya Home", where he played a father trying to get his daughter a doll of the rapper.

He appeared in the 2002 song "Oakland Raiders" by Oakland rap group Luniz. Delivering a humorous monologue as the song faded out, Curry asserted his status as a pimp and stated his fondness for big dank. Most recently he can be seen in the 2015 music video "Pull Up" by Young Dolph featuring 2Chains and Juicy J; a tribute to the movie "Coming to America."

Personal life
On May 17, 2007, an aerosol can that had fallen behind a water heater exploded, and Curry, who was doing laundry at the time, was burned on more than 20% of his body, including his arm, back, and side. He spent many months recuperating at his home. According to an Associated Press interview posted on CNN.com on February 17, 2008, Curry considered suicide after waking from a three-day, medically induced coma, but decided against it with the help of friends and fellow comedians, such as Sinbad and Bill Cosby. Curry went on The Montel Williams Show to discuss his recovery.

Filmography

Film

Television

References

External links

 

1961 births
Living people
African-American male actors
American male comedians
American male telenovela actors
Participants in American reality television series
Male actors from Oakland, California
California State University, East Bay alumni
Comedians from California
21st-century American comedians
21st-century African-American people
20th-century African-American people